The National Pharmacies Christmas Pageant is a parade held annually in the South Australian capital of Adelaide. Established in 1933, the event is staged annually on the second Saturday of November, typically from 9.30am except 2020 and 2021 where it was broadcast at 7:00pm. It comprises a procession of 85 sets and 1,700 volunteers, including some 63 floats, 15 bands, 164 clowns, dancing groups, and walking performers, all culminating in the arrival of Father Christmas. The pageant is officially recognised as a "heritage icon" by the National Trust of Australia, and a "state institution" by the Government of South Australia.

The pageant has been owned by the South Australian Government since 1996, and National Pharmacies has been the naming rights sponsor since 2019.

The pageant route commenced on King William Street at South Terrace and ran through the city to terminate at Adelaide Town Hall. Before 2019, the pageant traditionally ended on North Terrace outside the John Martin's (later David Jones building) where from Father Christmas would proceed inside to the Magic Cave. During the COVID-19 pandemic, the pageant was instead held in Adelaide Oval to a limited audience on a ballot system.

History
Adelaide's Christmas Pageant was founded by Sir Edward Hayward, owner of the Adelaide department store John Martin's, who was inspired by the Toronto Santa Claus Parade and Macy's Thanksgiving Day Parade. He opened the first 'Children's Christmas Parade' on 18 November 1933 at the height of the Great Depression. It was a success; running for around 40 minutes with just 8 floats and 3 bands, it attracted 200,000 spectators and from then the tradition of the John Martin's Christmas Pageant or as it was affectionately known the  'Johnnie's Christmas Pageant' was born. Father Christmas was introduced in 1934 and tradition of the pageant finishing at the Magic Cave (itself created in 1905) was established.

During the war years of 1941–1944, the pageant was in abeyance. It was restored in 1945. By 1969, the event had grown significantly, with attendances reaching 500,000 and television broadcasting commencing. In 1979, the largest induction of new floats took place, with 16 joining the pageant.

In 1985, John Martin's was acquired by David Jones Limited, who continued the pageant under the John Martin's name. However, with the collapse of the Adelaide Steamship Group (of which David Jones was a significant member), and the public float of the David Jones retailing arm, in the mid-1990s the South Australian Government acquired the event. It sought sponsorship from the South Australian business community, and in 1996 sold the naming rights to the six South Australian Credit Unions: Australian Central, Savings & Loans, Community CPS, PowerState, Satisfac and the Police Credit Union. Today, the pageant is managed by Events South Australia, a division of the South Australian Tourism Commission. As a result of mergers, the current naming right sponsors until 2018 were People's Choice Credit Union, Beyond Bank Australia, Credit Union SA and Police Credit Union. One Johnnie's tradition that the credit unions have been delighted to continue is that of the Pageant Queen. In 2009 a Pageant King and Princes were introduced to the Pageant and with the Pageant Queen and Princesses make up the Pageant Royal Family. The Royal Family tour the state visiting schools, libraries and children's groups as well as the Women's and Children's Hospital on Pageant Day to share the Pageant magic.

In 2008 there was a Guinness world record attempt for the longest and largest Mexican wave, but it failed.

In 2010 the spectators broke the record for the largest group of carol singers singing Christmas carols at the same time. They set a record of over 9,100 carol singers, breaking the previous record of 7,541 set in the USA.

In 2019, National Pharmacies acquired the naming rights sponsorship of the event. The pageant was additionally rerouted; no longer terminating at its traditional ending at the David Jones (previously John Martin's) building on North Terrace, it instead follows an adjusted route that finishes at Adelaide Town Hall.

Due to the COVID-19 pandemic, the 2020 pageant was altered drastically for the very first time. Instead of the traditional street parade it was more likened to an arena spectacular. The pageant was held at Adelaide Oval to a permitted audience of 25,000. The event was shifted from its traditional morning timeslot to a twilight performance starting at 7pm. Tickets were drawn from a ballot.

The 2021 event was again held at Adelaide Oval because of continuing restrictions and the Delta variant, again with the ballot system in place. However, the permitted audience was increased to 35,000 and masks were mandatory.

The 2022 pageant returned to the street parade format using the 2019 route towards Adelaide Town Hall, with approximately 100,000 people in attendance due to continuing COVID restrictions and a thunderstorm.

Broadcast
The Pageant is currently broadcast officially by NWS-9, the local affiliate of the Nine Network. For many years the broadcast was carried by SAS-7, ABS-2 and ADS-10.

Previous commentators have included; Jane Reilly, Ron Sullivan, Patsy Biscoe, Anne Haddy (guest), Brenton Whittle, Robin Roendfeldt, Joanna Moore, Kevin Crease, Lynn Weston, Franci Chammings, Cheryl Mills, Sue Baron, Lionel Williams. Alec Macaskil, Ric Marshall, Pam Tamblyn, John Bannon (guest), Grant Piro, Benita Collins, Tania Nugent, Simon Burke, Jane Doyle, Pete Michell, Dale Sinclair, Elizabeth Doyle, Tony Brooks, Malcolm Harslett, Sandy Roberts, Judith Barr, Julie Anthony (guest), John Bok and Richard Coombe.

Commentators and Presenters in recent years have includes:

2005: Rob Kelvin and Georgina McGuinness, with Mark Bickley and Lisa McAskill.
2006: Rob Kelvin and Georgina McGuinness, with Mark Bickley and Lisa McAskill.
2007: Georgina McGuinness and Kym Dillon, with Mark Bickley and Lisa McAskill.
2008: Kelly Nestor and Brenton Ragless, with Georgina McGuinness, Mark Bickley and Kate Collins.
2009: Brenton Ragless and Kate Collins, with Kelly Nestor and Jason 'Snowy' Carter.
2015: Brenton Ragless and Kate Collins with Virginia Langeberg (Virginia's last time). This was the first time the pageant was broadcast interstate to Perth, Melbourne and Sydney on GEM

References

External links

 

Recurring events established in 1933
Christmas Pageant
Christmas and holiday season parades
Parades in Australia
Festivals established in 1933